Giovanni Mazzalupi (born 11 December 1934) is an Italian field hockey player. He competed in the men's tournament at the 1960 Summer Olympics.

References

External links
 

1934 births
Living people
Italian male field hockey players
Olympic field hockey players of Italy
Field hockey players at the 1960 Summer Olympics